Milakovići may refer to:
 Milakovići, Montenegro
 Milakovići (Prijepolje), Serbia